Bigg Snoop Dogg Presents...Welcome to tha Chuuch: Da Album is a 2005 various artists compilation, executive produced by Snoop Dogg. The "Save Tookie" version of the single "Real Soon", by the DPGC featuring Jamie Foxx, can be downloaded for free from the Doggystyle Records website. It features the reunited Tha Dogg Pound and the comeback for The Lady of Rage.

Track 1,10 features the artist Mira Craig who is best known in Norway.

There were two videos launched for promotion. One was "Real Soon" with the artists involved as DPGC that gained fair airplay, especially around December, and the other for "Shake That" directed by Mike Taylor of Robot Films and shot in Los Angeles but with St. Louis color, red dominating the set. Cameo appearances are made by Warren G and Zab Judah with the latter being cut off because of his knock out win over St. Louis native Cory Spinks in February 2005 after the video was wrapped.
The two music videos landed on the LAUNCH Music Videos Top 100 at the 37th and 35th spot respectively.

Critical reception 

The album overall received mixed reviews from music critics.

Commercial performance
The album debuted at number 184 on the US Billboard 200 chart, selling 15,074 copies in its first week.

Track listing

Singles 
2005 - "Real Soon"
2006 - "Shake That Shit"

Chart performance

Bigg Snoop Dogg presents...Welcome 2 tha Chuuch Mixtapes Vol. 1-9 Greatest Hits 

Bigg Snoop Dogg presents...Welcome 2 tha Chuuch Mixtapes Vol. 1-9 Greatest Hits is a 2009 various artists compilation, with songs by Snoop Dogg.It is not an official release or an official mixtape.

Track listing

 Intro
 A.D.I.D.A.C. (ft. Lil' ½ Dead, Bad Azz, RBX, E-White & Bishop Don Juan)
 Never Scared (ft. Daz)
 Succ A Dicc (ft. Daz & Uncle Junebugg)
 DoDo Remix (ft. Beanie Siegel, Freeway, Soopafly, E-White, Kokane & Jellyroll)
 All I Want (ft. Bad Azz)
 I’m Fly (ft. Nate Dogg & Warren G)
 That’s What This Dicc Will Do (ft. Lil' ½ Dead & Bad Azz)
 Like A Pimp (ft. Daz)
 Getaway
 Angry
 What Would You Do (ft. Lil' ½ Dead, Daddy V & Bad Azz)
 Sippin On Some Moet (ft. Uncle Junebugg, RBX, Twinz, E-White, Daz & Soopafly)
 How 2 Survive
 Keep On Blazin’ (ft. Menenski)
 Pass The Dutch Bitch (ft. Soopafly)
 Come Up To My Room & Fucc
 Crippin’ 2 Tuff
 Dogg House Soulfood (ft. Butch Cassidy, Latoiya Williams & Kokane)
 Stormy Weather (ft. Willie Hutch)

See also 
Boss'n Up

References 

Albums produced by Battlecat (producer)
Albums produced by JellyRoll
Albums produced by L.T. Hutton
Albums produced by Terrace Martin
Albums produced by Soopafly
Snoop Dogg compilation albums
2005 compilation albums
E1 Music compilation albums
2009 compilation albums
Gangsta rap compilation albums
G-funk compilation albums